PLB or Personal Locator Beacon is a type of distress radiobeacon.

PLB may also refer to:
 Physics Letters B, a scientific journal covering nuclear physics, Particle physics, and astrophysics.
 Processor Local Bus, a bus used for IBM's PowerPC processors
 Programming Language for Business 
 Public light bus, a form of public transport in Hong Kong
 Pursed lip breathing, a breathing technique used in medicine 
 Premier League of Belize the highest competitive football league in Belize
 Clinton County Airport's IATA code
 Phospholipase B
 Phospholamban